Stéphane Lauzon  (born April 27, 1966) is a Canadian Liberal politician. Lauzon was elected to represent the riding of Argenteuil—La Petite-Nation in the House of Commons of Canada in the 2015 federal election.

Lauzon worked at the Canadian International Paper Company in the 1980s, and returned to school in 1992 to become a certified vocational instructor.  He worked in vocational training for twenty years thereafter, and then started a construction management company.  He has since also taken classes toward a bachelor's degree in business administration at the Université du Québec en Outaouais.

In 2009, he was elected to the city council of Gatineau.  From 2012 until his resignation in 2015 he chaired the municipal committee on sports and recreational matters.

Electoral record

References

External links

 Official Website

1966 births
Living people
Gatineau city councillors
Liberal Party of Canada MPs
Members of the House of Commons of Canada from Quebec
Université du Québec en Outaouais alumni
21st-century Canadian politicians